The Montenegro women's national football team represents Montenegro in international women's football, and it is organised by the Football Association of Montenegro.

History
Montenegrin women's team was founded in 2012, six years after Montenegro gained independence. It is organised and headed by Football Association of Montenegro. The team is founded four years after the establishing of first women's football competition in Montenegro.
With head coach Zoran Mijović, Montenegro played first match on 13 March 2012 in Bar, against Bosnia and Herzegovina (2:3). Two days later, Montenegro gained its first draw, also against Bosnia and Herzegovina (2:2).
Montenegro made its official competitive debut on 4 April 2013 in the 2015 World Cup qualification's preliminary round, drawing 3–3 against the Faroe Islands. Only two days later, Montenegro made first win in team's history, against Georgia – 2:0.
On that tournament, played in Vilnius, Montenegro made a big surprise, because they qualified for the final round of 2015 FIFA Women's World Cup qualification (UEFA).
In April 2015, on debut of new head coach Derviš Hadžiosmanović, Montenegro made biggest win in team's history, against Macedonia away – 7:0.
Montenegro participated in Euro 2017 qualifiers, but finished without any single point earned. On qualifying game against Spain away, Montenegro recorded biggest defeat in history (0:13)
Second appearance in World Cup Qualifiers, Montenegro had during the April 2017. On World Cup 2019 qualifying tournament, which hosted Faroe Islands, Montenegro finished third, with one win and two defeats, but with positive goal-difference (8:6). On last game, Montenegro made the biggest all-time victory in qualifiers, against Luxembourg (7:1).

Team image

Home stadium
The Montenegro women's national football team plays their home matches on the Gradski stadion or the Stadion Mitar Mićo Goliš.

Results and fixtures

 Since 2007, Montenegro's national team has played dozens of qualifying and friendly matches every year.
 The following is a list of match results in the last 12 months, as well as any future matches that have been scheduled.

Legend

2022

2023

Head-to-head record
Below is a list of performances of Montenegro women's national football team against every single opponent.
Last update: 26 October 2021.

Coaching staff

Current coaching staff

Manager history
First head coach in the history of Montenegrin women's team was Zoran Mijović. He led team from 2012 to 2014. 
At the beginning of 2015, as a new head coach was named Derviš Hadžiosmanović.

Players

Current squad
 The following players were called up for the World Cup 2023 qualifying against Azerbaijan and Denmark on 21 and 26 October 2021.
Caps and goals as of 26 October 2021.

Recent call-ups
 The following players were named to a squad in the last 12 months.

Records

Players in bold are still active, at least at club level.

Most capped players

Top goalscorers

Competitive record
Since its foundation, Montenegro women's national football team played in two qualification rounds for big tournaments so far. On both occasions, Montenegro failed to qualify.

FIFA Women's World Cup

UEFA Women's Championship

See also

 Sport in Montenegro
 Football in Montenegro
 Women's football in Montenegro
 Football Association of Montenegro
 List of official matches of the Montenegro women's national football team
 Montenegrin Women's League
 Montenegrin Cup (women)

References

External links
 Official website
 FIFA profile

 
European women's national association football teams
National